The Star Awards for Favourite Onscreen Couple (Drama) was an award presented annually at the Star Awards, a ceremony that was established in 1994.

The category was introduced in 2011, at the 17th Star Awards ceremony; Christopher Lee and Jeanette Aw received the award for their roles in Breakout and it is given in honour of a pair of artistes–one actor and one actress (not necessary to be contracted under Mediacorp)–who portrayed a drama series couple that is deemed the most popular among the television audience. In 2011, the nominees were determined by a team of judges employed by Mediacorp. The rule was removed in 2012 to allow the public to determine the nominees entirely via online voting. Winners are also selected by a majority vote from the public via online voting as well.

Since its inception, the award was given to four onscreen couples – four different actors and two different actresses. Qi Yuwu and Aw are the most recent and final winners in this category for their roles in The Dream Makers II. Elvin Ng and Rui En; and Qi and Aw are the only onscreen couples to win in this category twice. In addition, Lee and Jesseca Liu; Li Nanxing and Rui En; Ng and Rui En; Qi and Aw; Qi and Joanne Peh; Qi and Rui En have been nominated on two occasions, more than any other onscreen couple.

For the actors who were nominated in this category, Ng and Qi are the only actors to win in this category twice. In addition, Qi has been nominated on six occasions, more than any other actor. Li holds the record for the most nominations without a win, with three.

For the actresses who were nominated in this category, Aw is the only actress to win in this category four times, surpassing Rui En who has two wins. In addition, Rui En has been nominated on 11 occasions, more than any other actress. Ann Kok, Liu, Peh, Julie Tan, and Zhou Ying hold the record for the most nominations without a win, with two.

The award was discontinued from 2017, along with the Favourite Male Character and Favourite Female Character awards.

In 2022, the award was revived but came under a new name called Favourite Couple. Also, Favourite Male Character came with a new name Favourite Male Show Stealer	and Favourite Female Character came with a new name Favourite Female Show Stealer.

Recipients

 Each year is linked to the article about the Star Awards held that year.

Category facts

Most wins

Most nominations

References

External links 

Star Awards